The Golden Gate Ballroom, originally named the "State Palace Ballroom", was a luxurious ballroom located at the intersection of Lenox Avenue and 142nd Street in Harlem in New York City. It was allegedly the largest public auditorium in Harlem, with 25,000 square feet and a capacity of about 5,000 people on the dance floor in addition to several thousand spectators.

History 
The serial entrepreneur Jay Faggen led the project to open the Golden Gate Ballroom, which took place in October 1939. The site had formerly been the Douglas Theater. By mid-1940, it was taken over by the same owner and manager as the Savoy Ballroom. It was one of many Harlem jazz clubs located on Lenox Avenue and competed intensely with the Savoy Ballroom.

The Golden Gate closed around 1950.

Notable performers at the Golden Gate included Les Hite, Harlan Leonard, Claude Hopkins, Milt Herth, Jimmie Lunceford, Count Basie, Hot Lips Page, Josh White, Art Tatum, Billie Holiday, Hazel Scott, and Coleman Hawkins. The opening night stars were the Cotton Club Parade, Stepin Fetchit, and Louis Armstrong.
The Teddy Wilson orchestra was the house band.

The ballroom was the first site used by pastor Alvin A. Childs' ministry in Harlem.

The Golden Gate Ballroom also hosted community events such as political rallies and the "Miss Fine Brown Frame" beauty pageant and served as a roller skating rink.

Notes

References

Further reading 
 Image of Charlie Christian playing guitar at the Golden Gate Ballroom
 
 
 

Harlem
Jazz clubs in Harlem
Nightclubs in New York City
African-American history in New York City
African-American music